Addiction is a monthly peer-reviewed scientific journal established in 1903 by the Society for the Study of Addiction to Alcohol and other Drugs as the British Journal of Inebriety. It was renamed British Journal of Addiction to Alcohol & Other Drugs in 1947, then renamed to British Journal of Addiction in 1980, before finally obtaining its current name in 1993. It covers research relating to the abuse of alcohol, illicit drugs, and tobacco, as well as behavioural addictions. The editor-in-chief is John Marsden (King's College London).

Article types 
The journal publishes research reports, reviews, commentaries, and letters to the editor relating to all aspects of addictive behaviours.

Abstracting and indexing 
The journal is abstracted and indexed in:

According to the Journal Citation Reports, the journal has a 2019 impact factor of 6.340.

References

External links

English-language journals
Publications established in 1884
Addiction medicine journals
Monthly journals
Wiley-Blackwell academic journals